Two ships of the Royal Navy have been named HMS Auricula :

  an  sloop launched in 1917 and sold in 1923
 , a  launched in 1940 and lost in 1942 during the Battle of Madagascar.

Royal Navy ship names